Jimmie Lawrence Vaughan (born March 20, 1951) is an American blues rock guitarist and singer based in Austin, Texas. He is the older brother of the late Texas blues guitarist Stevie Ray Vaughan.

Several notable blues guitarists have had a significant influence on Vaughan's playing style, including the "Three Kings" (Albert, Freddie, and B.B. King) and Johnny "Guitar" Watson.

Early career 
Jimmie Vaughan was born on March 20, 1951, in Dallas County, Texas, United States, to parents Jimmie Lee Vaughan and Martha Jean Cook. Raised in Dallas, Texas, Vaughan attended L V. Stockard Junior High where on February 3, 1965, he first played before an audience in a group named The Pendulums, or the JSP's, along with Phil Campbell and Ronny Sterling. Vaughan moved to Austin in the late 1960s and began playing with such musicians as Paul Ray and WC Clark.

In 1969, Vaughan's group opened for The Jimi Hendrix Experience in Fort Worth, Texas. It was at this show that Vaughan lent Jimi Hendrix his Vox Wah-wah pedal which Hendrix ended up breaking. In return, Hendrix gave Vaughan his own touring Wah-wah pedal.

Jimmie Vaughan developed his own easily recognized personal style. He formed the band The Fabulous Thunderbirds with lead singer and harpist Kim Wilson, bassist Keith Ferguson, and drummers Mike Buck and Fran Christina. (The original Fabulous Thunderbirds were all protégés of Austin, Texas blues club owner Clifford Antone). The band's first four albums, released between 1979 and 1983, are ranked among the most important 'white blues' recordings. These early albums did not sell well, so the band was left without a recording contract for a couple of years (during the time when Vaughan's younger brother achieved commercial success). During this time, Vaughan played lead guitar on fellow Texas blues musician Bill Carter's 1985 album, Stompin' Grounds, also playing Carter's most well-known song, "Willie The Wimp", which would be introduced a year later to Stevie Ray Vaughan and played on live albums.

The Fabulous Thunderbirds got a new contract in 1986, and made several albums with a more commercially popular sound and production style. Vaughan left the band in 1990, and made his only "duo album", Family Style, with his younger brother, Stevie Ray Vaughan. Before the album's release, Stevie Ray died in a helicopter crash along with three members of Eric Clapton's entourage in East Troy, Wisconsin, on August 27, 1990. The album was released a month after the accident. The artist listed on the album was "The Vaughan Brothers". The album was light, blues-influenced rock, with Jimmie Vaughan singing on several tracks.

Personal life 

Vaughan released his first solo album Strange Pleasure in 1994. The album contained a song "Six Strings Down" that was dedicated to the memory of his brother. He has continued his solo career since then. Vaughan's solo albums contain mostly blues-rock material that he writes himself. He made a special guest appearance on Bo Diddley's 1996 album A Man Amongst Men, playing guitar on the tracks "He's Got A Key" and "Coatimundi". In 2001, Vaughan paid an installment on his (and the Fabulous Thunderbirds') debt to harmonica swamp blues when he contributed guitar to the Lazy Lester album Blues Stop Knockin.' 

He has a son, Tyrone Vaughan.

Since 1997 Fender has produced a Jimmie Vaughan Tex-Mex Stratocaster.

Vaughan appeared in the 1998 released film Blues Brothers 2000 as a member of the fictional "Louisiana Gator Boys" blues band led by BB King.

Vaughan is close friends with Dennis Quaid. They worked together on the film Great Balls of Fire.

Vaughan was the third opening act for most of the dates of Bob Dylan's summer 2006 tour, preceded by Elana James and the Continental Two and Junior Brown.

Vaughan loves classic and custom cars, and is an avid car collector. Vaughan has had many of his customs and hot rods displayed in museums, as well as featured in rodding and custom magazines.

2000s 
Vaughan continues to perform. He has also been politically active to some degree. He endorsed Republican Presidential candidate Ron Paul in 2008 and played before one of Paul's speeches at the University of Texas. Vaughan also opened for Ron Paul's keynote address at the Rally for the Republic in St. Paul, Minnesota on September 2, 2008. Vaughan appeared with Boz Scaggs & The Blue Velvet Band at the 2009 Hardly Strictly Bluegrass Festival in San Francisco's Golden Gate Park. Vaughan performed at Ron Paul's "We are the Future" rally in Tampa, Florida on August 26, 2012.

Shout! Factory released Jimmie Vaughan's first new album in nine years, Plays Blues, Ballads & Favorites, on July 6, 2010.

Vaughan played with Eric Clapton, Robert Cray, BB King, Hubert Sumlin, and others during the 2010 Crossroads Guitar Festival.

Vaughan performed on the episode of the TBS cable television show Conan, that aired December 22, 2010.

Vaughan performed at the 11th Edition of the International Jazz Festival|Xerox Rochester International Jazz Festival on Friday, June 29, 2012.

In 2014, Vaughan performed at the Mahindra Blues Festival in India alongside the Tedeschi Trucks Band.

Vaughan performed guitar as a guest on an episode of the PBS cable television show Austin City Limits, with the Foo Fighters, which aired on February 7, 2015. He and the Foo Fighters were accompanied on stage by another guest guitarist, Gary Clark, Jr., a native of Austin, Texas.

His 2019 recording, Baby, Please Come Home, was chosen as a 'Favorite Blues Album' by AllMusic.

Select discography

Singles 
 1972: The Storm – "The Doo-It" // "Lost On The Ocean Part 2" (Connie Records)
 1986: Jimmie Vaughan & Duke Robillard – "Cookin'" (Guitar Player Magazine [7" flexi-disc])

Albums 
 1979: The Fabulous Thunderbirds – Girls Go Wild (Takoma/Chrysalis)
 1980: The Fabulous Thunderbirds – What's The Word (Chrysalis)
 1981: The Fabulous Thunderbirds – Butt Rockin''' (Chrysalis)
 1982: The Fabulous Thunderbirds – T-Bird Rhythm (Chrysalis)
 1986: The Fabulous Thunderbirds – Tuff Enuff (CBS Associated)
 1987: The Fabulous Thunderbirds – Hot Number (CBS Associated)
 1989: The Fabulous Thunderbirds – Powerful Stuff (CBS Associated)
 1990: The Vaughan Brothers – Family Style [with Stevie Ray Vaughan] (Epic)
 1994: Jimmie Vaughan – Strange Pleasure (Epic)
 1998: Jimmie Vaughan – Out There (Epic)
 2001: Jimmie Vaughan – Do You Get The Blues? (Artemis)
 2007: Omar Kent Dykes & Jimmie Vaughan – On The Jimmy Reed Highway (Ruf)
 2010: Jimmie Vaughan – Plays Blues, Ballads & Favorites (Shout! Factory/Proper)
 2011: Jimmie Vaughan – Plays More Blues, Ballads & Favorites (Shout! Factory/Proper)
 2017: Jimmie Vaughan Trio – Live At C-Boy's [with Mike Flanigin, Barry "Frosty" Smith] (Proper/Last Music Co.)
 2019: Jimmie Vaughan – Baby, Please Come Home (Last Music Co.)
 2020: Jimmie Vaughan – The Pleasure's All Mine (The Complete Blues, Ballads & Favorites Sessions) (Last Music Co.) 2-CD compilation
 2021: Jimmie Vaughan – The Jimmie Vaughan Story (Deluxe Edition, 5-CD set, with 1 x 12" vinyl LP, 2 x 7" vinyl singles, and a 240-page book) (Last Music Co.)

 Awards 
 Grammy Awards 
 1990: Contemporary Blues Recording ‒ The Vaughan Brothers ‒ Family Style 1990: Rock Instrumental Performance ‒ The Vaughan Brothers ‒ "D/FW"
 1996: Rock Instrumental Performance ‒ "SRV Shuffle"
 2001: Traditional Blues Album ‒ Do You Get The Blues?''

Blues Music Awards 
 2020: Traditional Blues Male Artist of the Year

References

External links 
 Official website
Jimmie Vaughan Interview NAMM Oral History Library (2020)

1951 births
Living people
American blues guitarists
American male guitarists
Lead guitarists
American blues singers
Blues rock musicians
Electric blues musicians
Musicians from Dallas
Texas blues musicians
Texas Republicans
Singers from Texas
Grammy Award winners
Stevie Ray Vaughan
Soul-blues musicians
Guitarists from Texas
The Fabulous Thunderbirds members
20th-century American guitarists
People from Oak Cliff, Texas
Proper Records artists
Epic Records artists